Watching the Snow is a jazz album by American singer Michael Franks. It was released in Japan by Columbia Records in 2003, in the U.S. by Sleepy Gypsy in 2004, and again in the U.S. by Koch Records.

Watching the Snow was Michael Franks' first Christmas album. Rather than covering other holiday music standards, Franks wrote all the songs. According to the liner notes, sales from the album were donated to Hearts United for Animals.

Track listing

Reception

Writing for AllMusic, Christopher Monger described the album as "comfort food with all the trimmings" and that each track was "lovingly crafted, astronomically inoffensive, and wine-drunk silly and sincere."

Comparing the album to the holiday themed releases of Franks' peers, he concluded it was a "testimony to Franks' laid-back demeanor and subtle humor that an entire record of original holiday songs can complement a snowy December day rather than accentuate its forced seasonal cheer."

Personnel
 Michael Franks – vocals
 Veronica Nunn – vocals, background vocals
 Alex Sipiagin – trumpet, flugelhorn
 John Clark – French horn
 Chris Hunter – saxophone, flute
 Charles Blenzig – keyboards, percussion
 Jay Azzolina – guitar
 Romero Lubambo – guitar
 Jay Anderson – double bass 
 Billy Kilson – drums

References

Bibliography

Michael Franks (musician) albums
2003 albums
Columbia Records albums
Rhino Entertainment albums
2003 Christmas albums
Christmas albums by American artists
Jazz Christmas albums
E1 Music albums